Pukovac is a village in Doljevac municipality in Serbia.

References

Populated places in Nišava District